The Hum Honorary Music Award is awarded annually (as of first ceremony) by the Board of Directors of the Hum Television Network and Entertainment Channel (HTNEC) at the annual ceremony for an individual's outstanding contribution to Music, all the nominations and voting for this category are restricted to HTNEC.
  
This award is one of honorary awards of Hum Awards which is given to individuals every year or particular year. Winners of this award are given same Hum Statuette, which is given to other Merits categories. As of 1st Hum Awards there have been one award presented.

Honorary Music Award incepted with the origin of first Awards, as of first ceremony Indian born Pakistani Starists Ustad Rais Khan was honoured.

Recipients

Following is the listing of the recipients of Hum Honorary Music Award:

2010s

See also

 Hum Awards
 1st Hum Awards

References

External links 
Official websites
 Hum Awards official website
Other resources
 

Hum Award winners
Hum Awards